The Zschirnsteine are two prominent table hills in the German part of the Elbe Sandstone Mountains. They are located in the municipality of Reinhardtsdorf-Schöna, about 7 km south of the German resort of Bad Schandau. They lie west of the River Elbe and not far north of the Czech border.

The 561 m high Großer Zschirnstein ("Great Zschirnstein") is the highest hill in Saxon Switzerland.

The Kleiner Zschirnstein ("Little Zschirnstein") is also a sandstone table hill. It is 473 m high and lies north of the Großer Zschirnstein.

Both tables lie in the midst of a forest and may be climbed on foot. They offer extensive views of the Elbe Sandstone Mountains and beyond. A good base for walking to the hills is the Panoramahotel Wolfsberg near the village of Reinhardtsdorf.

Literatur

External links 

Mountains of Saxon Switzerland
Reinhardtsdorf-Schöna
Hills of Saxony

eo:Großer Zschirnstein